Åre is a locality and one of the leading Scandinavian ski resorts situated in Åre Municipality, Jämtland County, Sweden with 3,200 inhabitants in 2018. It is, however, not the seat of the municipality, which is Järpen. 25% of the local economy is based on tourism, most notably the downhill skiing and biking resorts in Åre, Duved and Storlien. The growth in tourism has resulted in the development of hotels, recreational and shopping opportunities in the area.

History 
In the 12th century the Åre Old Church was built. Saint Olaf the Holy is a historical figure who has influenced the village and for centuries pilgrims passed through the village on their way to Trondheim. Sami people settled in the mid-17th century to take advantage of good reindeer pasture. In the 18th and 19th century the copper mines in Fröå were important industries. Tourism started to grow with the establishment of a railroad in 1882, and Åre's first Grand Hotel was erected in 1896. The kings of Sweden and Norway came to stay in Åre and Storlien for recreational purposes since the 19th century.

Geography 
Åre is situated in Åredalen (Åre Valley), approximately  AMSL at the coastline of Åresjön lake. Through Åre goes the European route E14 and the Mittbanan railway, connecting the larger towns Östersund and Trondheim.

Tourism 
Tourism in Åre started as King Oscar II in 1882 supervised construction of the Östersund–Trondheim railway. With this new railway, many people came to Åre to breathe the fresh air and to walk to the top of Åreskutan. They were soon known as "air-guests" (Sw. luftgäster).

There was no hotel, but in 1888 Albin Wettergren opened a restaurant by the railway station. In 1891, Åre Tourist Station opened and even more guests were attracted to the village.

A lady from Östersund saw this increasing tourism as a great opportunity to open a hotel and did so in 1895. It was called "Hotell Åreskutan". Albin Wettergren opened a hotel ("Grand Hotell") as well. These were only a few of all the hotels that were going to be founded in Åre.

In 1910, the funicular Åre Bergbana was built and was the third one in Sweden after Skansens Bergbana in Stockholm (1898) and the one in Kiruna (1907). This was a more convenient way for the air-guests to reach the top of Åreskutan.

In 2008, the hotel Copperhill Mountain Lodge opened on the top of the Förberget hill. Designed by American architect Peter Bohlin, it is the only mountain hotel in Scandinavia referred to as a "Design Hotel".

Winter events 

Taking advantage of the Åreskutan fell, Åre Ski Area has become the major center for alpine skiing in Sweden, sporting more than 30 modern ski-lifts. It hosted the Alpine World Championships in 1954, 2007 and 2019, and the annual Jon Olsson Invitational freeskiing competition, ending in 2007. On 9–10 March 2012, the Freestyle FIS World Cup was held at the Slalombacken slalom course close to the village centre, and on 18 Feb 2020 a sprint race in the FIS Cross-Country World Cup was held at the same place.

2021 Special Olympics World Winter Games
Åre along with Östersund were initially selected to host the 2021 Special Olympics World Winter Games. It would have marked the first time that Sweden has ever hosted the Special Olympics. However, due to a variety of issues including lack of funding, on 19 December 2019, the event will not take place in Sweden. Instead it will take place in Kazan, Russia and was delayed to 2022.

Winter Olympics
Åre has also been the site for the alpine events in Sweden's eight failed bids to host the Olympic Winter Games, including for the 1984, 1988, 1992, 1994, 1998, 2002, 2022 and 2026. This is because Åre has the only piste in Sweden suitable for top-level downhill races.

Notable people 
 Henrik Lundqvist – New York Rangers goaltender, gold medalist in 2006, 2012 Vezina trophy winner and twin brother of Joel Lundqvist 
 Joel Lundqvist – Frölunda HC captain and checking forward, two-time world champion, former Dallas Star and twin brother of Henrik Lundqvist
 Jon Olsson - Professional freestyle skier, X-Games Champion and social media influencer
 Henrik Windstedt  – winner of the 2008 Freeride World Tour
 Lars-Börje Eriksson – Olympic alpine skiing bronze medalist
 Henrik Harlaut – Professional freestyle skier

Summer events 
Åre has since the 1990s become the largest mountainbike resort in Sweden. In 1999 it was the host for the UCI Mountain Bike & Trials World Championships and it hosted the Nordic Championships 2007.
There are numerous graded downhill cycling trails. The Åre Bikepark is open from 1 May until 15 October and is the host for the Mayhem Festival.

During summer Åre can also sport hiking, paragliding, kayaking, and a golf course about 15 minutes from the village. In July every year there is a multisport competition in Åre – Åre Extreme Challenge. It counts as the Scandinavian championship in multisport.

"One of the world's ten best ski-resorts" 
In 2008 Åre was appointed as one of the ten best ski-resorts in the world at the list from the magazine Condé Nast Traveller

Transport 
The nearest airport is situated 99 kilometres (62 mi) eastward, on the island of Frösön in Östersund. Åre Östersund Airport is an international airport and the ninth biggest in Sweden with roughly 390 000 passengers (2005).

The European route E14 runs through Åre from Trondheim via Östersund to Sundsvall, where it merges with the European route E45.

Åre also has a train station. Norrtåg operates the Mittbanan railway from Storlien (where Trondheim-bound diesel trains connect), via Åre and Östersund to Sundsvall. Åre is connected to Stockholm, Gothenburg and Malmö through long distance SJ 3000 (higher-speed trains) and InterCity. Åre is also served by seasonal overnight trains.

References

External links

VisitAre.com- Official resort website
Resort magazine
SkiStar Åre
Are Sweden – Details and information on Åre

 
Populated places in Åre Municipality
Jämtland
Former Norwegian populated places
Ski areas and resorts in Sweden